Werner Schodoler (also Wernher Schodoler (1490 in Bremgarten, Aargau – 15 October 1541, in Bremgarten, Aargau) was a Swiss chronicler.  He was the author of Swiss History, the earliest of the Swiss illustrated chronicles.

Literature  
Walter Muschg and Eduard A. Gessler  Die Schweizer Bilderchroniken des 15/16 Jahrhunderts Zurich, Atlantis Verlag, 1941.

External links

 Eidgenössische Chronik des Werner Schodoler
 
  NZZ Archiv, 1951, Der Alte Zürichkrieg im Spiegel der Schodoler-Chronik (PDF; 4,1 MB)

Swiss chronicles
1490 births
1541 deaths
People from Bremgarten District
16th-century Swiss historians
People from Bremgarten, Aargau